Kym Ireland (born 25 October 1955) is a former Australian field hockey player.

Ireland represented Australia as part of the Australia women's national field hockey team at the 1984 Summer Olympics in Los Angeles.  Ireland was the team's goalkeeper.  It was the first time The Hockeyroos represented Australia at an Olympic Games.

Placing fourth overall, the team did not medal.  However, one of the highlights of Ireland's performance at the 1984 Olympics was stopping eleven shots from Beth Anders' twelve attempts at goal in Australia's victory over America.

Ireland returned to her hometown of Rockhampton, Queensland in 2013 after spending fifteen years in Brisbane, Queensland where she coached at schools and hockey clubs.

Upon returning to Rockhampton, she began coaching local hockey team, Park Avenue Brothers.

Not long after her return to Rockhampton, Ireland discovered that a Ukrainian artist living in the city had painted a life-sized portrait of her, along with twenty other Olympians.  The artist had painted the portraits in 2004 but had decided to start selling the items.  Ireland bought the painting of herself for $30.  The painting had been previously displayed with the others in Rockhampton's historic Customs House during the 2008 Summer Olympics.

In 2014, Ireland said she was disappointed in the way that Kookaburra Jamie Dwyer, also from Rockhampton, was told he wouldn't be competing in the 2014 Commonwealth Games after he was told in an email that he was axed from the team.  Ireland said such a procedure was wrong and needed to be addressed.

References

External links
 

Australian female field hockey players
1955 births
Living people
Olympic field hockey players of Australia
Field hockey players at the 1984 Summer Olympics